Toma Toke (born Ha'ateiho, 20 June 1985) is a Tongan rugby union footballer. He plays as a prop. His current team is Doncaster Knights.

He was selected for the Tongan squad that entered the 2007 Rugby World Cup finals, playing three matches. He was later chosen for the Tonga autumn European tour. He has currently 12 caps for his national team, with 1 try scored, 5 points on aggregate.

Notes

External links

1985 births
Living people
Tongan rugby union players
Rugby union props
Tonga international rugby union players
Doncaster R.F.C. players
Tongan expatriate rugby union players
Expatriate rugby union players in England
Tongan expatriate sportspeople in England
People from Tongatapu